Roy Lucas (November 27, 1941 – October 31, 2003) was an American lawyer and abortion rights activist, known for drafting a law review that laid the theoretical background behind the principles articulated in Roe v. Wade.

Lucas was graduated NYU Law School in 1967. Lucas was teaching at University of Alabama when he was writing "Federal Constitutional Limitations on the Enforcement and Administration of State Abortion Statutes" in North Carolina Law Review in 1968. Dean Daniel Meador at University of Alabama served 1966 to 1970.

Lucas established the James Madison Constitutional Law Institute to work for women's abortion rights, and was instrumental in numerous abortion rights cases in the 1960s and 1970s, including Roe v. Wade.  After 1986, he focused primarily on art, painting and writing about art. Although he wrote abortion until he died.

He died of a heart attack in October 31, 2003.

Bibliography
 "Federal Constitutional Limitations on the Enforcement and Administration of State Abortion Statutes," 46 North Carolina Law Review 730 (June 1968)

Notes

Further research
 David Garrow, Liberty and Sexuality: The Right to Privacy and the Making of Roe v. Wade (University of California Press, 1998).
 David Garrow, How Roe v. Wade Was Written Was Written, 71 Wash. & Lee L. Rev. 893 (2013)
 A. Raymond Randolph, "Address: Before Roe v. Wade: Judge Friendly's Draft Abortion Opinion", Harvard Journal of Law & Public Policy (Summer 2006), v.29, n.3, pp. 1035–1062 (an unpublished draft opinion in an abortion rights case, preceded by a lengthy commentary from a conservative jurist discussing the history of abortion rights jurisprudence)
 Robert O. Self, "How Choice Won", Salon.com, Sept. 22, 2012.

 Research Libraries
 "Abortion Litigation Papers of Roy Lucas", Collection at Wesleyan University

1941 births
2003 deaths
20th-century American lawyers
American abortion-rights activists